Kurukshetra Lok Sabha constituency is one of the 10 Lok Sabha (parliamentary) constituencies in Haryana state in India. This constituency covers the entire Kurukshetra and Kaithal districts and part of Yamunanagar district.

Kurukshetra Lok Sabha seat was initially Kaithal Lok Sabha seat and till 1977 its headquarters was also Kaithal. Kurukshetra Lok Sabha seat came into existence in 1977. Elections from 2nd to 5th Lok Sabha were held at Kaithal Lok Sabha seat

Assembly segments
At present, Kurukshetra Lok Sabha constituency comprises nine Vidhan Sabha (legislative assembly) constituencies. These are:

Members of Parliament

Election Results

See also
Kurukshetra district
List of Constituencies of the Lok Sabha

Notes

References

Lok Sabha constituencies in Haryana
Kurukshetra district
Kaithal district
Yamunanagar district